Hoffman is a city in Grant County, Minnesota, United States, along the Chippewa River.  The population was 681 at the 2010 census.

History
Hoffman was platted in 1887, and named for Robert C. Hoffman, a railroad official. A post office has been in operation at Hoffman since 1887.

Geography

Minnesota State Highways 27 and 55 are two of the main routes in the community.

Demographics

2010 census
As of the census of 2010, there were 681 people, 285 households, and 150 families residing in the city. The racial makeup of the city was 95.7% White, 0.1% African American, 0.4% Native American, 0.6% Asian, 0.1% Pacific Islander, 1.6% from other races, and 1.3% from two or more races. Hispanic or Latino of any race were 3.1% of the population.

There were 285 households, of which 25.3% had children under the age of 18 living with them, 41.1% were married couples living together, 7.4% had a female householder with no husband present, 4.2% had a male householder with no wife present, and 47.4% were non-families. 39.3% of all households were made up of individuals, and 21.1% had someone living alone who was 65 years of age or older. The average household size was 2.24 and the average family size was 3.07.

The median age in the city was 43.2 years. 21.6% of residents were under the age of 18; 6.4% were between the ages of 18 and 24; 24.6% were from 25 to 44; 22.3% were from 45 to 64; and 25.1% were 65 years of age or older. The gender makeup of the city was 47.7% male and 52.3% female.

2000 census
As of the census of 2000, there were 672 people, 274 households, and 164 families residing in the city. The racial makeup of the city was 98.36% White, 0.45% African American, 0.89% Native American, and 0.30% from two or more races. Hispanic or Latino of any race were 0.15% of the population.

There were 274 households, out of which 26.3% had children under the age of 18 living with them, 49.3% were married couples living together, 8.8% had a female householder with no husband present, and 39.8% were non-families. 35.0% of all households were made up of individuals, and 23.4% had someone living alone who was 65 years of age or older.  The average household size was 2.25 and the average family size was 2.94.

In the city, the population was spread out, with 21.3% under the age of 18, 7.1% from 18 to 24, 21.6% from 25 to 44, 19.0% from 45 to 64, and 31.0% who were 65 years of age or older.  The median age was 45 years. For every 100 females, there were 87.2 males.  For every 100 females age 18 and over, there were 86.3 males.

The median income for a household in the city was $29,464, and the median income for a family was $42,955. Males had a median income of $31,818 versus $18,333 for females. The per capita income for the city was $16,725.  About 1.9% of families and 10.6% of the population were below the poverty line, including 10.2% of those under age 18 and 14.6% of those age 65 or over.

Notable person
Harley Refsal - Norwegian-American woodcarver honored by a king of Norway.

References

External links

City website
Herman-Hoffman Tribune, local newspaper

Cities in Minnesota
Cities in Grant County, Minnesota